Risky Dwiyan Apriliyanto (born 1 April 1999) is an Indonesian professional footballer who plays as a midfielder for Liga 1 club Persebaya Surabaya.

Club career

Persebaya Surabaya
Dwiyan was signed for Persebaya Surabaya and played in Liga 1 in the 2022–23 season. He made his league debut on 25 July 2022 in a match against Persita Tangerang at the Gelora Bung Tomo Stadium, Surabaya.

Career statistics

Club

Honours
Persebaya Surabaya U20
 Elite Pro Academy U-20: 2019

Persikab Bandung
 Liga 3 West Java: 2021

References

External links
 Risky Dwiyan at Soccerway
 Risky Dwiyan at Liga Indonesia

1999 births
Living people
Indonesian footballers
People from Kediri (city)
Sportspeople from East Java
Persikab Bandung players
Persebaya Surabaya players
Liga 1 (Indonesia) players
Association football midfielders